Arthur Charles Wood (24 June 1898 – 14 May 1959) was an Australian rules footballer who played for and coached South Melbourne in the Victorian Football League (VFL).

Arthur Wood, known as 'Artie', was a wingman and made his debut during the 1917 season. He was a member of the South Melbourne premiership team of 1918.

He spent the 1921 season as playing coach, despite being aged only 25, and the club finished in seventh position.

References

Holmesby, Russell and Main, Jim (2007). The Encyclopedia of AFL Footballers. 7th ed. Melbourne: Bas Publishing.

External links

1898 births
Australian rules footballers from Melbourne
Sydney Swans players
Sydney Swans Premiership players
Sydney Swans coaches
1959 deaths
One-time VFL/AFL Premiership players
People from Williamstown, Victoria